Vaalee is a 2001 Indian Kannada-language romantic psychological thriller film directed by S. Mahendar starring Sudeep in a double role and Poonam Singar. The film features background score and soundtrack composed by Rajesh Ramanath and lyrics by K. Kalyan.

The film released on 19 October 2001 and had a below average box office run. It is a remake of the 1999 Tamil film of the same name. After this film, Sudeep went on to portray several gray characters.

Plot

Deva and Shiva are twins. Deva, the elder, is deaf and mute. But he is a genius, an expert at lip-reading and the head of a successful advertising company. Shiva loves and trusts his brother. Priya wants to marry only someone who is an ex-smoker, an ex-drunkard and ditched by a girl but still pining for her. Learning this, Shiva invents an old romance between him and Sona and finds his way into Priya's heart.

Deva meanwhile chances upon Priya and becomes obsessed with attaining her. His obsession continues even after his younger brother marries the girl of his dreams and he devises various means of getting close to Priya and keeping Shiva and her separated. Some of the methods Deva uses to woo Priya are masochistic (wounding his hand by the running car engine to stop the couple’s first night) and psychotic (trying to kill his brother in so many ways).

While Shiva is away, Priya has to take care of Deva. Priya realises the not-so-honourable intentions Deva has towards her but Shiva refuses to believe her and has full faith in his brother. He even goes as far as to take Priya to a psychiatrist. To get away from it all, Shiva and Priya go on a long-delayed honeymoon. But Deva shows up there too. Shiva watches Deva kissing the photo of Priya and realises Priya was right all along. Deva beats Shiva mercilessly, packs the unconscious Shiva in a gunny bag and throws him in a lorry.

Deva disguises himself as Shiva and goes near Priya. Priya realises he is Deva and escapes from him before shooting him with her revolver. Deva falls into a pool and dies. Deva's soul talks about his inability to express his feeling as he was mute. Shiva comes and she narrates the whole incident to him. They hug tearfully.

Cast

Sudeep as Shiva / Deva (double role)
Poonam Singar as Priya
Sadhu Kokila as Vicky
Gurukiran as in a guest appearance as Ravi
Bank Janardhan as shop owner
Shanthammma as Shiva and Deva's grandmother
Hema Bellur
Michael Madhu

Soundtrack

The soundtrack was composed by Rajesh Ramnath, reusing all the tunes from the original Tamil version, which was originally composed by Deva. Sudeep sang two songs for the film, marking his debut as a playback singer.

Awards
Filmfare Awards South :-
Nominated, Best Film
Nominated, Best Director - S. Mahendar
Nominated, Best Music Director - Rajesh Ramanath

References

External links

2000s Kannada-language films
Kannada remakes of Tamil films
Films scored by Rajesh Ramnath
Twins in Indian films
Indian romantic thriller films
Films directed by S. Mahendar
2000s romantic thriller films